The Avenues may refer to:
The Avenues, Salt Lake City, a neighbourhood in Salt Lake City, Utah
The Avenues, Harare, a suburb of Harare, Zimbabwe
The Avenues (gang), a street gang in Los Angeles county, California
The Avenues (Kuwait), the largest shopping mall in Kuwait and second largest in the Middle East
The Avenues (shopping mall), a shopping mall in Jacksonville, Florida
The Avenues, Bahrain, a shopping mall in Manama, Bahrain
The Avenues, Kingston upon Hull, an area in the city of Kingston upon Hull, England
In the Phoenix metropolitan area, "the avenues" can refer to the west side of town
The combined nickname of the Sunset District and Richmond District, San Francisco, California

See also
 Avenue (disambiguation)